1974 Soviet Second League was a Soviet competition in the Soviet Second League.

Qualifying groups

Group I [Central Asia]

Group II [Centre and Northwest]

Group III [Centre and Greater Caucasus]

Group IV [Central Strip and Ural]

Group V [Siberia and the Far East]

Group VI (Ukraine)

Promotion playoffs

Semifinal Group 1 
 [Frunze]

Semifinal Group 2 
 [Grozny]

Semifinal Group 3 
 [Kharkov]

Final group 
 [Nov 20-30, Sochi]

References
 All-Soviet Archive Site
 Results. RSSSF

Soviet Second League seasons
3
Soviet
Soviet